The upper echelons theory is a management theory published by Donald C. Hambrick and Phyllis A. Mason in 1984.
It states that organizational outcomes are partially predicted by managerial background characteristics of the top level management team.

History 
Donald C. Hambrick, a strategic management professor and P. Mason first published an article about the upper echelon perspective in 1984. The article is cited over 16,000 times  and several additional articles in this field of research have been published over the last decades.

Premise 
The theory tries to explain a correlation between the organizational outcome and managerial background characteristics.

Application fields 
The theory is used in human resource management as a framework helping to hire new executives. In addition to that, the theory can be used to analyze other market competitors or listed companies and predict future strategic decisions of CEOs.

See also

References 

Management